Vaccine is a peer-reviewed medical journal, published by Elsevier. It is targeted towards medical professionals who are interested in vaccinology, vaccines, and vaccination. The official journal of the Edward Jenner Society and the Japanese Society for Vaccinology, Vaccine describes itself as "an interface between academics, those in research and development, and workers in the field", covering topics "rang[ing] from basic research through to applications, safety and legislation." , Gregory A. Poland is Vaccines editor-in-chief.

References

External links
 Official website

Elsevier academic journals
English-language journals
Publications established in 1983
Vaccinology journals
Weekly journals